Vlădila is a commune in Olt County, Oltenia, Romania. It is composed of three villages: Frăsinet-Gară, Vlădila and Vlădila Nouă.

References

Communes in Olt County
Localities in Oltenia